The Apple iPod+HP was a line of Hewlett-Packard-branded iPods, distributed through HP.

On January 8, 2004, Carly Fiorina announced the Apple iPod+HP deal at the Consumer Electronics Show. The first device of the iPod+HP line was the fourth-generation iPod, available in 20 and 40 GB of storage. The Apple iPod+HP was originally intended to be available in "HP Blue". 

HP later added the iPod mini, the iPod photo, and the iPod shuffle to the lineup. As these were officially HP products rather than Apple products, Apple Store Genius Bars were not authorized to repair Apple iPod+HP iPods, and they had to be sent to an HP Authorized Service Center for repair, despite identical designs.

Deal termination 
On July 29, 2005, HP announced that it would terminate its deal with Apple. Even though the deal was terminated, part of the deal prevented HP from making a rival digital music player (MP3 player) until August 2006. HP continued to pre-install iTunes on home computers until January 6, 2006, when HP announced a partnership with RealNetworks to install Rhapsody on HP and Compaq-branded home players under the HP brand.

References

Hewlett-Packard
IPod
ITunes